The 2003–04 season was the 102nd in the history of the Western Football League.

The league champions for the seventh time in their history were Bideford, but it was runners-up Paulton Rovers who took promotion to the Southern League. The champions of Division One were Hallen.

Final tables

Premier Division
The Premier Division remained at 18 clubs after Team Bath were promoted to the Southern League, and Bath City Reserves left the league. Two clubs joined:

Exmouth Town, runners-up in the First Division.
Torrington, champions of the First Division.

First Division
The First Division remained at 19 clubs after Exmouth Town and Torrington were promoted to the Premier Division and two clubs joined:

Clevedon United, promoted from the Somerset County League.
Shrewton United, promoted from the Wiltshire League.

References

2003-04
8